Charles Banks may refer to:

 Charles Arthur Banks (1885–1961), Lieutenant-Governor of British Columbia
 Charles C. Banks (1893–1971), World War I flying ace
 Charles Eugene Banks (1852–1932), American newspaper editor and writer
 Charles L. Banks (1914–1988), United States Marine Corps general
 Charlie Banks (rugby league) (born 1922), rugby league player
 Charlie Banks (One Life to Live), a fictional character on the ABC soap opera One Life to Live
 Charles Banks, co-owner of Screaming Eagle Winery and Vineyards

See also
 Charles Banks Wilson (1918–2013), American artist
 Charlie Banks (disambiguation)